Late Night with Seth Meyers is an American late-night talk show hosted by Seth Meyers on NBC. A total of  episodes have aired.

Episodes

2014

2015

2016

2017

2018

2019

2020

2021

2022

2023

References

External links
 
 Lineups at Interbridge 

Episodes
Late Night with Seth Meyers
Late Night with Seth Meyers